Shashaank Sharma (born 7 September 1992) is an Indian cricketer who plays for Services. He made his first-class debut on 22 December 2013 in the 2013–14 Ranji Trophy, for Himachal Pradesh.

References

External links
 

1992 births
Living people
Indian cricketers
Himachal Pradesh cricketers
Services cricketers
Cricketers from Himachal Pradesh
Wicket-keepers